Tony Downes is the Deputy Vice-Chancellor and Professor of Law of the University of Reading.

Downes specialises in commercial law and was educated at the University of Oxford and Aix-Marseille University.

References

Academics of the University of Reading
Living people
Year of birth missing (living people)
Alumni of the University of Oxford
Place of birth missing (living people)